Stirtonia may refer to:

 Stirtonia (lichen), a genus of lichen in the family Arthoniaceae
 Stirtonia (mammal), a genus of extinct New World monkey
 Stirtonisorex, a genus of extinct shrew formerly known as Stirtonia
 Stirtonanthus, a genus of legumes formerly known as Stirtonia

es:Stirtonia